John Pitt (1698–1754) was a British Army officer, colonial administrator and politician who sat in the House of Commons between 1720 and 1734.

Pitt was the youngest son of Governor Thomas "Diamond" Pitt who made a fortune while in India and returned to Britain to found a political dynasty. He attended Eton College, and went into the army where he rose to the rank of lieutenant colonel and served as an aide-de-camp to George I.

Pitt served as Member of Parliament for Hindon from 1720 to 1722, Old Sarum from 1724 to 1726 and Camelford from 1727 to 1734. From 1728 to 1737 he served as Governor of Bermuda.

Pitt was cut out of his father's will after a dispute. He was the brother-in-law of James Stanhope, 1st Earl Stanhope, the effective Prime Minister between 1717 and 1721, and the uncle of William Pitt. He was married to Mary Belasyse, the daughter of the Viscount Fauconberg.

References

Bibliography
 Black, Jeremy. Pitt the Elder. Cambridge University Press, 1992.
 Brown, Peter Douglas. William Pitt, Earl of Chatham: The Great Commoner. George Allen & Unwin, 1978.

1698 births
1754 deaths
18th-century British Army personnel
People educated at Eton College
Governors of Bermuda
John
Members of the Parliament of Great Britain for English constituencies
British MPs 1715–1722
British MPs 1722–1727
British MPs 1727–1734
Grenadier Guards officers